is the twelfth single of J-pop idol group Morning Musume and was released July 25, 2001. It sold a total of 682,320 copies and reached number one on the Oricon Charts. This song is also a personal favorite of ex-Morning Musume member, Rika Ishikawa, as the monologue spoken by her towards the end of the song became one of her favorite moments of being in Morning Musume.

The single version (later preserved on the Best! Morning Musume 2 anthology) contains a fade-out, suggesting to the listener that the song's multiple false endings continued infinitely. The version heard on the album 4th Ikimashoi! is billed as the "Complete Version" and does not fade out, instead coming to a stop several seconds beyond the single version's fadeout.

Members at the time of single 
 1st generation: Kaori Iida, Natsumi Abe
 2nd generation: Kei Yasuda, Mari Yaguchi
 3rd generation: Maki Goto
 4th generation: Rika Ishikawa, Hitomi Yoshizawa, Nozomi Tsuji, Ai Kago

Track listing 
All lyrics are composed by Tsunku.
 
 
 "The Peace!" (Instrumental)
 "Dekkai Uchū ni Ai ga Aru" (Instrumental)

Personnel 
 Kaori Iida – vocals
 Natsumi Abe – vocals
 Kei Yasuda – vocals
 Mari Yaguchi – vocals
 Maki Goto – vocals
 Rika Ishikawa – vocals
 Hitomi Yoshizawa – vocals
 Nozomi Tsuji – vocals
 Ai Kago – vocals

The Peace! 
 Dance☆Man and The Band☆Man
 Dance☆Man – arranger, and bass
 DJ Ichiro – turntable 
 Hyu Hyu – drums
 Jump Man – guitar
 Stage Chakka Man – percussion
 Wata-Boo – keyboards
 Horns Man Brothers – horn section
 Kubō Kawamatsu – trombone
 Nobuyoshi Kuwano – trumpet
 Tetsuya Tanaka – trumpet
 Narutaka Yamanaka – saxophone
 Tsunku – chorus

Dekkai Uchū ni Ai ga Aru 
 Daisuke Kawai – Hammond organ
 Hideyuki Kowamatsu – bass
 Yasubaru Nakanishi – piano
 Nobu Saitō – percussion
 Yasuo Sano – drums
 Shunsuke Suzuki – arranger and guitar

External links 
 The Peace! entry at Up-Front Works Official Website

Japanese-language songs
Morning Musume songs
Zetima Records singles
2001 singles
Oricon Weekly number-one singles
Songs written by Tsunku
Song recordings produced by Tsunku
Japanese synth-pop songs
Dance-pop songs
Peace songs
2001 songs